Delano Area Rapid Transit (DART) is the operator of mass transportation in Delano, California. Four routes operate within the city, which serves most of the urban development. There is one transit hub, located at the intersection of 11th Avenue and Fremont Street. DART also offers "Dial-a-Ride service, which provides door to door service for seniors and people with disabilities.

References

External Source
Delano Area Rapid Transit

Public transportation in Kern County, California
Bus transportation in California